William Wilson (1836 – 8 November 1879) was an Irish lawyer and politician.  He was elected to the United Kingdom House of Commons as Member of Parliament (MP) for Donegal at a by-election in 1876, and held the seat until his death three years later at his home in Raphoe at the age of 43. He became a solicitor in 1860, and married in 1865. He sat in Parliament as a Moderate Conservative.

References

External links 

1836 births
1876 deaths
Members of the Parliament of the United Kingdom for County Donegal constituencies (1801–1922)
UK MPs 1874–1880